Niccolò di Noferi del SodoGrosso (fl. c. 1500), also known as Il Caparra for his habit of asking for payment in advance, was one of the few Renaissance ironsmiths that we can identify. He was born in Florence and his most important works are on the exterior of Palazzo Strozzi (the Strozzi Palace) there. These include a lantern in the shape of a classical temple and stands for flag-poles and torches featuring elaborate imaginary animals. Grosso was praised by Giorgio Vasari as the best of ironsmiths.

Sometimes, miniature reproductions of Grosso's Lantern on the Palazzo Strozzi can be found on the second hand market, many new designs are inspired by his original (which was probably a mixture of original influences).

Gallery

References

Italian blacksmiths
16th-century Italian businesspeople